Geoffrey Trueman (7 January 1926 – 28 June 1981) was an Australian cricketer. He played 24 first-class matches for New South Wales between 1951/52 and 1953/54.

See also
 List of New South Wales representative cricketers

References

External links
 

1926 births
1981 deaths
Australian cricketers
New South Wales cricketers
Cricketers from Sydney